The K.W. Neatby Building is located at the Central Experimental Farm in Ottawa, Ontario, Canada. The building contains the Eastern Cereal and Oilseed Research Centre (ECORC), a research centre belonging to the Research Branch of Agriculture and Agri-Food Canada.  The building is a Recognized Heritage Building of Agriculture and Agri-Food Canada.

References

External links
  AAFC Page 

Federal government buildings in Ottawa